The 2004 United States presidential election in Wisconsin took place on November 2, 2004, and was part of the 2004 United States presidential election. Voters chose 10 representatives, or electors to the Electoral College, who voted for president and vice president.

Wisconsin was won by Democratic nominee John Kerry by a 0.38% margin of victory. Prior to the election, most news organizations considered the state a toss-up, or a crucial swing state, and faced similar political scrutiny to neighboring Michigan, Minnesota, and Iowa. On election day, Kerry barely carried the state over President George W. Bush. The results in Wisconsin were nearly identical to the results from four years earlier, when Al Gore squeaked by Bush, and the 2020 presidential election when Joe Biden had a similarly narrow victory in the Badger State against Donald Trump. 

As of the 2020, this is the last time that Wisconsin failed to back the overall winner of the Electoral College, and thus the state is tied with Michigan and Pennsylvania for the longest streak of supporting the national winner up to the present day. This was also only the third time since 1960 (after 2000 and 1988) that it would vote for the losing candidate. Bush is to date the only Republican presidential candidate to win two terms in office without carrying Wisconsin at least once.

Until 2020, this was the last time Wisconsin voted for a different candidate than neighboring Iowa; in both cases Iowa voted Republican while Wisconsin voted Democratic.

Primaries
 2004 Wisconsin Democratic presidential primary

Campaign

Predictions
There were 12 news organizations that made state-by-state predictions of the election. Here are their last predictions before election day.

Polling
Pre-election polling had Bush and Kerry winning polls, with neither candidate grasping a strong lead. The last 3 poll averages showed Bush leading 49% to 46%.

Fundraising
Bush raised $1,993,040. Kerry raised $1,130,602.

Advertising and visits
Bush visited the state 12 times. Kerry visited the state 14 times. A total of between $1.3 million to $3.6 million was spent each week.

Analysis
Wisconsin has voted for the Democratic presidential nominee in the last four elections before the fifth time in 2004. The urban centers of Milwaukee and Madison tend to vote strongly Democratic. The suburbs of those cities are politically diverse, but tend to vote Republican. Counties in the western part of the state tend to be liberal, a tradition passed down from Scandinavian immigrants. The rural areas in the northern and eastern part of the state are the most solidly Republican areas in Wisconsin.

The CNN exit polls showed a dead heat between the two. However, the deciding factor for Kerry's victory was union members who voted for him with 62%, while non-members (83% of the population) voted for Bush with just 52% of the vote.

Results

By county

Counties that flipped from Republican to Democratic
Iron (Largest city: Hurley)
Price (Largest city: Park Falls)

Counties that flipped from Democratic to Republican
Columbia (Largest city: Portage)

By congressional district
Bush and Kerry each won four congressional districts.

Electors

Technically the voters of Wisconsin cast their ballots for electors: representatives to the Electoral College. Wisconsin is allocated 10 electors because it has 8 congressional districts and 2 senators. All candidates who appear on the ballot or qualify to receive write-in votes must submit a list of 10 electors, who pledge to vote for their candidate and his or her running mate. Whoever wins the majority of votes in the state is awarded all 10 electoral votes. Their chosen electors then vote for president and vice president. Although electors are pledged to their candidate and running mate, they are not obligated to vote for them. An elector who votes for someone other than his or her candidate is known as a faithless elector.

The electors of each state and the District of Columbia met on December 13, 2004, to cast their votes for president and vice president. The Electoral College itself never meets as one body. Instead the electors from each state and the District of Columbia met in their respective capitols.

The following were the members of the Electoral College from the state. All 10 were pledged for Kerry/Edwards.
 Gail Gabrelian
 Margaret McEntire
 Jordan Franklin
 Martha Toran
 Jim Shinners
 Jan Banicki
 Daniel Hannula
 Steve Mellenthin
 Glenn Carlson
 Linda Honold

See also
 United States presidential elections in Wisconsin

References

Wisconsin
2004
Presidential